Kenny Martin (born August 20, 1960 in Broadview Heights, Ohio) is a racing driver who drove ARCA and NASCAR. He is better known by finishing 5th in his debut in the Craftsman Truck Series at the inaugural Daytona 250 which was filled by a number of trucks out of the race, driving the #98 truck. He only made six more starts since, and would finish 9th at Memphis Motorsports Park. That was Martin's last start in NASCAR until trying to attempt to make the race at Dover, where he did not make the field. Since then, he has not made a NASCAR start or ARCA as well. He is not related to NASCAR Sprint Cup driver Mark Martin.

Motorsports career results

NASCAR
(key) (Bold – Pole position awarded by qualifying time. Italics – Pole position earned by points standings or practice time. * – Most laps led.)

Craftsman Truck Series

ARCA Bondo/Mar-Hyde Series
(key) (Bold – Pole position awarded by qualifying time. Italics – Pole position earned by points standings or practice time. * – Most laps led.)

References

External links
 

1960 births
Living people
People from Broadview Heights, Ohio
NASCAR drivers
ARCA Menards Series drivers
Racing drivers from Ohio
Sportspeople from Cuyahoga County, Ohio